Kindled Courage is a 1923 American silent Western film directed by William Worthington and featuring Hoot Gibson. It is not known whether the film currently survives, and it may be a lost film.

The film is a member of the Universal-produced and Carl Laemmle-selected "The Laemmle Nine", which also includes A Dangerous Game, The Flaming Hour, The Ghost Patrol, The Scarlet Car, The Power of a Lie, The First Degree, The Love Letter, and The Gentleman From America.

Plot
As described in a film magazine, after constantly being taunted as being a coward by his friends, Andy Walker (Gibson) decides to skip out for parts unknown. On the next train he hops a freight car in which are two desperadoes. Just as Andy enters the car, the train's brakeman enters and in a gunfight kills both bandits but is badly wounded himself. Terrified, Andy sits in a corner of the car until the train arrives at its next stop, where a posse boards the train and the Sheriff (Russell) hails Andy as a hero. He is appointed Chief Deputy and sent out to hunt Overland Pete (Hart) and his gang. As he is about to leave, Betty Paxton (Burnham), the sister of one of the bandits, arrives seeking her brother. The Sheriff has Andy take her along as a decoy for the gang. On the road Andy falls in love with her. They stumble upon the gang and Andy, through fool luck, kills them off. He goes home a real hero with Betty as his bride.

Cast
 Hoot Gibson as Andy Walker
 Beatrice Burnham as Betty Paxton
 Harold Goodwin as Hugh Paxton
 Harry Tenbrook as Sid Garrett
 J. Gordon Russell as Sheriff (credited as James Gordon Russell)
 Russ Powell as Marshal (credited as J. Russell Powell)

See also
 Hoot Gibson filmography

References

External links
 
 

1923 films
1923 Western (genre) films
American black-and-white films
Films directed by William Worthington
Universal Pictures films
Silent American Western (genre) films
1920s American films
1920s English-language films